Ualapue is an unincorporated community and census-designated place on the island of Molokai in Maui County, Hawaii, United States. Its population was 393 as of the 2020 census. The community is located along Hawaii Route 450 on the southeast coast of the island of Molokai. Ualapue does not have villages, but many famous fishponds.

Geography

Demographics

References

Populated places on Molokai
Unincorporated communities in Maui County, Hawaii
Unincorporated communities in Hawaii
Census-designated places in Maui County, Hawaii
Populated coastal places in Hawaii